Israel Hayom is an Israeli national Hebrew-language free daily newspaper. First published in 2007, Israel Hayom is Israel's most widely distributed newspaper.  Owned by the family of Sheldon Adelson, a personal friend and benefactor of Benjamin Netanyahu, Israel Hayom has often been criticized for portraying Netanyahu in an overly positive light. Israel Hayom is distributed for free around Israel. In turn, Netanyahu has been accused of attempting to benefit Adelson’s investments.

History

Israel Hayoms print edition, "financed by the American casino billionaire Sheldon Adelson," was launched on 30 July 2007, competing directly with Israeli, another free daily. That same year, Maariv editor Dan Margalit left the newspaper to write for Israel Hayom. A weekend edition was launched in October 2009. In 2014, Israel Hayom bought Israeli media outlets Makor Rishon and nrg מעריב.

In May 2014 the name מעריב (Maariv) was removed from nrg log, and it was rebranded as nrg. Following the acquisition an antitrust complaint was filed against Israel Hayom, which resulted in a court order that requested the transfer of the maariv domain name to Maariv weekly. In 2017, nrg was renamed to nrg360, and on 10 January 2018 the website closed; all of its content was merged into the Makor Rishon website.

Later that year, it’s believed, was when Sheldon Adelson invested at least $50 million in Israel Hayom. Adelson's support of Israeli Prime Minister Benjamin Netanyahu led the latter's political opponents in the Knesset to sponsor a bill that would prevent the distribution of newspapers in Israel for free. Although framed as a bill to prevent unfair competition and save the Israeli print newspaper industry,
there was an outcry against it. Critics of the bill said it hurts free enterprise and is a thinly veiled attempt to target Adelson and his political causes, as Israel Hayom was then Israel's only free-of-charge national newspaper. The bill passed the first reading in the Knesset, but not subsequent ones. In 2016, Adelson's attorney announced that although it was commonly believed that Adelson owned the newspaper, it was owned by a relative of his.

In January 2021, Saudi-American independent academic researcher, Najat Al-Saied, became the first person from the Arab states of the Persian Gulf to join Israel Hayom.

Political leaning
According to a 2022 study, Israel Hayom benefitted Benjamin Netanyahu and his Likud party electorally.

A 2008 study by Moran Rada published in The Seventh Eye showed that while competing newspapers' coverage of Benjamin Netanyahu was "not especially fair", Israel Hayoms coverage was biased in favor of Netanyahu in most editorial decisions, and that the paper chooses to play down events that do not help to promote a positive image for Netanyahu, while on the other hand touting and inflating events that help promote Netanyahu and the Likud. Oren Persico reached the same conclusion after the 2009 Knesset elections, writing that throughout the campaign Israel Hayom published only one article critical of the Likud, and tens of articles critical of Kadima.

A popular nickname of Israel Hayom is the "Bibiton", a portmanteau of Netanyahu's nickname "Bibi" with the Hebrew word for newspaper, iton. While in the Prime Minister's office, Ehud Olmert criticized Israel Hayom. Journalist Ben-Dror Yemini described the paper as having "endless capital with a political agenda".

In 2016, it formally endorsed the presidential campaign of Donald Trump.

Connection to Benjamin Netanyahu
Israel Hayom is owned by the family of Benjamin Netanyahu's personal friend and benefactor Sheldon Adelson, and is often criticized by the political left for portraying Netanyahu in an overly positive light.  Former Prime Minister Netanyahu was put on trial in five cases of alleged corruption; one of the cases, case 2000, directly involved Israel Hayom. According to the investigations, Netanyahu held three meetings with Arnon Mozes, editor of Yedioth Ahronoth, the main competitor of Israel Hayom, during which Netanyahu offered limiting the circulation of Israel Hayom in exchange for Yedioth Ahronoth hiring journalists more favorable to Netanyahu.

Market share

Being distributed for free, Israel Hayom has an edge over other daily newspapers in Israel. In July 2010, Israel Hayom surpassed Yedioth Ahronoth in weekday exposure rate in the semi-annual Target Group Index (TGI) survey.
  
As of 2021, Israel Hayom had a 31% weekday readership exposure, followed by Yedioth Ahronoth with 23.9%, Haaretz with 4.7% and Maariv with 3.5%.

In January 2016, citing internal records from Israel Hayom, Haaretz revealed that between 2007 and 2014 the newspaper lost about 730 million shekels ($190 million), approximately equal to one shekel per copy printed.

Employees
Senior management
 Asher Baharav – publisher.
 Boaz Bismuth – editor-in-chief.
 Zippi Koren – CEO.
 Ariel Schmidberg – deputy editor.
 Baruch Ron – deputy editor, news director.
 Amir Finkelshtein – chief operating officer.
 Eithan Segal – VP marketing.
 Riki Roob – chief financial officer.

Staff

 Shlomo Cohen – editorial cartoonist.
 Gideon Alon – parliamentary correspondent.
 Ran Reznick – health correspondent.
 Dan Margalit – senior commentator.
 Naama Lanski – magazine correspondent.
 Eli Sahar – sports editor.
 Shir Ziv – television critic.
 Boaz Bismuth – foreign news editor, senior analyst.

 Shlomo Cesana – diplomatic correspondent.
 Aviad Hacohen – legal affairs commentator.
 Ronen Dorfan – sports commentator.
 Yoav Kutner – music critic.
 Lilach Shoval – military correspondent.
 Mati Tuchfeld – political correspondent.
 Shlomo Scharf – sports commentator.

See also

List of free daily newspapers
List of national newspapers
List of newspapers in Israel

References

External links

  
  

Centre-right newspapers
Companies based in Tel Aviv
Daily newspapers published in Israel
Free daily newspapers
Hebrew-language newspapers
Israeli brands
Israeli companies established in 2007
Mass media companies of Israel
Mass media in Tel Aviv
Multilingual news services
Publications established in 2007
Sheldon Adelson